Javier Caceres (25 April 1925 – 2021) was a Peruvian sports shooter. He competed in the 50 metre rifle, prone event at the 1964 Summer Olympics.

References

External links
 

1925 births
2021 deaths
Peruvian male sport shooters
Olympic shooters of Peru
Shooters at the 1964 Summer Olympics
20th-century Peruvian people
People from Ancash Region